José César Güity Vuelto (born 19 May 1985) is a Honduran football player.

Club career
Nicknamed Baba, Güity started his career at Marathón and joined Chinese side Shanghai Shenhua for a short spell after the Beijing Olympics. After he returned to Honduras to play for Vida, he again moved abroad in summer 2009 to play for Costa Rican side Herediano, and made his debut in July 2009, immediately scoring the winning goal against L.D. Alajuelense. However, he already left them in August 2009 to make his debut for Guatemalan outfit Peñarol La Mesilla in October 2009.

Güity joined Guatemalans Jalapa for the 2010 Apertura championship. In July 2011 he went on trial to Salvadoran giants Alianza but he ended up in the Honduran second division with Parrillas One. He joined Real Sociedad for the 2012 Clausura.

International career
Güity played three games at the 2005 FIFA World Youth Championship in the Netherlands.
He was also part of the U-23 Honduras national football team that won the 2008 CONCACAF Men's Pre-Olympic Tournament and qualified to the 2008 Summer Olympics.

References

External links

1985 births
Living people
People from La Ceiba
Association football forwards
Honduran footballers
Footballers at the 2008 Summer Olympics
Olympic footballers of Honduras
C.D. Marathón players
Shanghai Shenhua F.C. players
C.D.S. Vida players
C.S. Herediano footballers
Deportivo Jalapa players
C.D. Real Sociedad players
Liga Nacional de Fútbol Profesional de Honduras players
Honduran expatriate footballers
Expatriate footballers in China
Expatriate footballers in Costa Rica
Expatriate footballers in Guatemala